The Police Union is a police union in Sweden. It has a membership of 18,500 (including police academy students), and is affiliated with the Swedish Confederation of Professional Employees, and EuroCOP. It also maintains contact with the Swedish branch of the International Police Association.

Swedish Confederation of Professional Employees
Police unions
Trade unions in Sweden
Trade unions established in 1903